Seraj Al-Saleem (born 10 February 1996) is a Saudi Arabian weightlifter. He won the bronze medal in the men's 61kg event at the 2021 World Weightlifting Championships held in Tashkent, Uzbekistan. He also won the silver medal in the men's 61kg event at the 2020 Asian Weightlifting Championships, also held in Tashkent, Uzbekistan.

He represented Saudi Arabia at the 2020 Summer Olympics in Tokyo, Japan. He finished in 5th place in the men's 61 kg event.

Career 

In 2014, he competed in the men's 56kg event at the World Weightlifting Championships held in Almaty, Kazakhstan. He also competed at the 2017 World Weightlifting Championships in Anaheim, United States and the 2019 World Weightlifting Championships in Pattaya, Thailand.

He competed in the men's 56kg event at the 2017 Asian Indoor and Martial Arts Games held in Ashgabat, Turkmenistan. He also represented Saudi Arabia in the men's 56kg event at the 2018 Asian Games held in Jakarta, Indonesia.

He won the silver medal in his event at the 2021 Islamic Solidarity Games held in Konya, Turkey. He competed in the men's 61kg event at the 2022 World Weightlifting Championships held in Bogotá, Colombia.

Achievements

References

External links 
 

Living people
1996 births
Place of birth missing (living people)
Saudi Arabian male weightlifters
Asian Games competitors for Saudi Arabia
Weightlifters at the 2018 Asian Games
Weightlifters at the 2020 Summer Olympics
Olympic weightlifters of Saudi Arabia
World Weightlifting Championships medalists
Islamic Solidarity Games competitors for Saudi Arabia
Islamic Solidarity Games medalists in weightlifting
21st-century Saudi Arabian people